Clement Cabell  Dickinson (December 6, 1849 – January 14, 1938), also known as Clement C. Dickinson, was a Democratic Representative representing Missouri from February 1, 1910, to March 3, 1921, from March 4, 1923 – March 3, 1929 and from March 4, 1931 – January 3, 1935.

Dickinson was born  at Prince Edward Court House, Virginia in Prince Edward County, Virginia.  He graduated from Hampden-Sydney College in Virginia in 1869 and taught in Virginia and Kentucky.  He moved to Clinton, Missouri in 1872 where he continued to teach and study law.  He was prosecuting attorney in Henry County, Missouri 1876–1882, city attorney in Clinton 1882–1884, a member of the Missouri House of Representatives 1900-1902 and the Missouri State Senate 1902–1906.  He was on the board of Central Missouri State University 1907–1913.

He was elected to Congress  to succeed David A. De Armond  who had died.  He failed to be re-elected in 1920 but served another two terms from 1931 to 1935 but was not renominated in 1934.  He is buried in Englewood Cemetery in Clinton.

References

External links

 
  The extension of remarks read into the Congressional Record by Clement C. Dickenson in 1914 are included in A Tribute to the Best Friend of Man: Eulogy on the Dog printed by Violet Press in 2008.

1849 births
1938 deaths
People from Prince Edward County, Virginia
People from Clinton, Missouri
Democratic Party members of the Missouri House of Representatives
Democratic Party Missouri state senators
Democratic Party members of the United States House of Representatives from Missouri